Federal Route 234, or Jalan Jerantut-Kuala Lipis (or also known as Jalan Sungai Jan in Jerantut) (formerly Pahang State Route C9) and Jalan Pekeliling in Kuala Lipis (formerly Pahang State Route C159)), is a federal road in Pahang, Malaysia. The roads connects Jerantut in the east until Kuala Lipis in the west. It is also a main route to Taman Negara (National Park) in Kuala Tembeling. The route starts at Jerantut, at its interchange with the Federal Route 64.

In 2012, the highway was gazetted as Federal Route 234.

Features

The Federal Route 234 was built under the JKR R5 road standard, allowing a maximum speed limit of up to 90 km/h.

List of junctions and towns

References

Malaysian Federal Roads